Black City was a Danish rock band from Aarhus, Denmark based in the Danish capital Copenhagen. The band consists of Kristian Klærke (Guitar), Bjørn Poulsen (Vocals, guitar), Anders Borre Mathiesen (Bass) and Jakob Bjørn Hansen (Hanson) (Drums). 

The band has released two studio albums: Black City (2010), and Fire (2013).

Discography

Studio albums

References

External links 

Danish rock music groups
Musical groups established in 2009
Musical groups disestablished in 2014